Jack Hamilton  (born 22 March 1994) is a Scottish professional footballer, who plays as a goalkeeper for Scottish Premiership side Livingston. He has previously played for Heart of Midlothian, Dundee and Greenock Morton, and Forfar Athletic, East Fife and Stenhousemuir on loan.

Club career

Early career
Hamilton attended both Nethermains Primary School and Denny High School and was a youth player for local side Stenhousemuir from 12 years-old. In 2009, aged 14 he joined Heart of Midlothian (Hearts) youth team, along with his brother Colin Hamilton.

Heart of Midlothian
A member of Hearts under-19 squad, in September 2011, Hamilton was promoted to the first team due to injury to Marián Kello. He was named as a substitute for a Scottish Premier League match at Inverness Caledonian Thistle but did not make an appearance. On 30 November 2012, he moved to Forfar Athletic on a one-month loan, which was then extended by a further month. He went out on loan again the following season, signing for East Fife in March 2014.

At the start of the 2014–15 season Hamilton joined Stenhousemuir on loan. Following injuries to Neil Alexander, Scott Gallacher and Robbie Brown, he was recalled from his loan and made his first team debut on 17 August 2014, playing from the start in a 2–1 win over Edinburgh derby rivals Hibernian.

In May 2016, Hamilton signed a contract extension, keeping him at Hearts until May 2019. Hamilton played regularly for Hearts during the 2016–17 season after Alexander was sold to Aberdeen, but lost his place to Jon McLaughlin in the following season.

Dundee
Hamilton signed a three-year contract with Dundee on 28 May 2018, for an undisclosed fee. He made his debut on 14 July in a 4–0 win at Stirling Albion in the Scottish League Cup, and manager Neil McCann praised his performance. On 4 August, in his first Premiership match for the Dee, he made a late error that allowed hosts St Mirren to win 2–1. Hamilton would find himself in and out of the starting role all season, as Dundee were eventually relegated at the end of the season. The following season in the Championship was once again full of inconsistencies for Hamilton, at one point conceding 6 goals to rivals Dundee United in one game. He again spent the campaign swapping in and out of the starting position before the season was ended early due to the coronavirus pandemic.

Hamilton would leave Dundee at the conclusion of his contract in 2021, though would leave on a positive as Dundee confirmed promotion to the Premiership.

Greenock Morton 
In July 2021, Hamilton signed a one-year deal with Scottish Championship side Greenock Morton. After playing every game of the 2021–22 season for Morton, Hamilton would not sign an extension and would leave the club at the end of the season.

Livingston 
On 19 August 2022, Hamilton signed a two-year deal with Scottish Premiership side Livingston.

International career
Hamilton has represented Scotland at under-15, under-16, under-17, under-18, under-19 and under-21 levels.

On 20 May 2016, Hamilton received his first call-up to the Scotland national football team for their friendlies against Italy and France.

Career statistics

References

External links

1994 births
Living people
Scottish footballers
Scotland youth international footballers
Scotland under-21 international footballers
Association football goalkeepers
Scottish Football League players
Scottish Professional Football League players
Heart of Midlothian F.C. players
Forfar Athletic F.C. players
East Fife F.C. players
Stenhousemuir F.C. players
Dundee F.C. players
Greenock Morton F.C. players
Livingston F.C. players